Emen is a village in Bor district of Niğde Province, Turkey. At  it is situated in the Central Anatolian plains. The population of Emen was 132 as of 2011.

References 

Villages in Bor District, Niğde